Jeremy Fergus Boissevain (August 5, 1928 – June 26, 2015) was a Dutch anthropologist. He was Emeritus Professor of Social Anthropology at the Amsterdam School for Social Science Research, University of Amsterdam.

Academic background
Boissevain was awarded his PhD in 1962 from the London School of Economics. He was professor of Anthropology at the University of Amsterdam continually from 1966 to 1993, and also taught at the Universities of Montreal, Sussex, Malta, New York (Stony Brook), Massachusetts (Amherst), Columbia University and the Jagiellonian University in Cracow.

History 
Boissevain first came to Malta in September 1961, and wrote his doctoral thesis – later published as “Saints and Fireworks – Religion and Politics in Rural Malta” – in the summer of 1962.

Bibliography

Saints and Fireworks: Religion and Politics in Rural Malta (1965, 1993)
Hal Kirkop: A Village in Malta (1969)
The Italians of Montreal (1970)
Network Analysis (editor, 1973)
Friends of Friends: Networks, Manipulators and Coalitions (1974)
Beyond the Community (editor, 1975)
Ethnic Challenge (editor, 1984)
Dutch Dilemmas: Anthropologists Look at the Netherlands (editor, 1989)
Revitalizing European Rituals (editor, 1992)
Coping with Tourists: European Reactions to Mass Tourism (1996)
Factions, Friends and Feasts: Anthropological Perspectives on the Mediterranean (2013)

See also
 Political anthropology

External links
 Interviewed by Alan Macfarlane 6th July 1983 (video)
Website of the Amsterdam School for Social science Research, where Boissevain worked
 Jeremy Boissevain, anthropologist who made Malta home, dies

1928 births
2015 deaths
Dutch anthropologists
English anthropologists
Academic staff of the University of Amsterdam
Alumni of the London School of Economics
Scientists from London